Green Bay West High School is a high school in Green Bay, Wisconsin, United States, serving the city's west side. Originally founded in 1890 as the high school for the town of Fort Howard (annexed into Green Bay in 1895), the school opened as West High School in 1910 and has occupied its current building since 1929.

History 
The institution that would become West High School opened in 1890 as the McCartney School, in what then was the neighboring town of Fort Howard. With the annexation of Fort Howard into Green Bay in 1895, the two school districts merged, though the McCartney School (known as Old West High) would continue to operate until 1910, when West High School formally opened. The McCartney School later took on west-side 8th graders, becoming a precursor junior high school. West High School received a new building in 1926, and has occupied that building since.

Athletics 

The school's mascot is a Wildcat. Its rivalry with Green Bay East High School is Wisconsin's longest consecutively-played high school football rivalry between in-state schools. In January 2014, the WIAA approved a realignment plan that moved both Green Bay East and Green Bay West out of the Fox River Classic Conference and into the Bay Conference starting in 2015-2016, which continued the East-West rivalry. West High School fielded Green Bay's first girls' basketball team, in 1911.

The Wildcats have won three WIAA state championships, most recently in 2014 for girls' hockey (a cooperative team). They also won the Class A state title in boys' track and field in 1934 and 1954.

Performing arts 
In the late 1900s, Green Bay West had a competitive show choir.

Notable alumni 
Like crosstown rival Green Bay East, many West alumni played for the Green Bay Packers in the team's earliest years.

Packers alumni 

Dutch Dwyer - original member of the Green Bay Packers
Riggie Dwyer - original member of the Green Bay Packers
Cowboy Wheeler - original member of the Green Bay Packers
Herman Martell - original member of the Green Bay Packers
Arnie Herber - member of the Pro Football Hall of Fame
Art Bultman
Norbert Hayes
Fee Klaus
Wes Leaper
Dave Mason
Charlie Mathys
Ray McLean 
Ken Radick
Joe Secord
Carl Zoll
Dick Zoll
Martin Zoll
Harry Sydney - USFL and NFL player
Jerry Tagge - NFL, WFL, and CFL player

Other alumni 
Jerome Quinn - Wisconsin State Representative, 1955-1973
Dick Campbell, Pittsburgh Steelers lineman

References

External links 
 Green Bay West High School
 Wildcat football

High schools in Green Bay, Wisconsin
Public high schools in Wisconsin
1890 establishments in Wisconsin
Educational institutions established in 1890